The Yellowknives Dene First Nation is a band government in the Northwest Territories. It represents the Yellowknives people, namesake of the territorial capital Yellowknife. Its membership primarily resides in two communities: Ndilǫ, bordering the City of Yellowknife at the tip of Latham Island, and Dettah, separated from the city by Yellowknife Bay.

References

First Nations in the Northwest Territories
Dene governments